Mahavir Singh may refer to:

Mahavir Singh (social reformer) (1920–1997), Indian justice, an authority of law and social reformer of India
Mahavir Singh Phogat, Indian amateur wrestler and senior Olympics coach
Mahavir Singh (politician) (born 1972), Indian politician and member of the Bharatiya Janata Party
Mahavir Singh (revolutionary) (1904–1933), Indian revolutionary and independence fighter in the 1930s